The 2018–19 Albany Great Danes men's basketball team represented University at Albany, SUNY in the 2018–19 NCAA Division I men's basketball season. They played their home games at the SEFCU Arena in Albany, New York and were led by 18th-year head coach Will Brown. They were members of the America East Conference. They finished the season 12–20, 7–9 in America East play to finish in a tie for fifth place. They lost in the quarterfinals of the America East tournament to UMBC.

Previous season
The Great Danes finished the 2017–18 season 22–10, 10–6 in America East Conference play to finish in fourth place. In the America East tournament, they were defeated by Stony Brook in the quarterfinals. Despite finishing with 22 wins, they opted to not play in a postseason tournament.

Roster

Schedule and results

|-
!colspan=12 style=| Non-conference regular season

|-
!colspan=9 style=| America East Conference regular season

|-
!colspan=12 style=| America East tournament
|-

|-

Source

References

Albany Great Danes men's basketball seasons
Albany Great Danes
2018 in sports in New York (state)